The 1963 Alabama Crimson Tide football team (variously "Alabama", "UA" or "Bama") represented the University of Alabama in the 1963 NCAA University Division football season. It was the Crimson Tide's 69th overall and 30th season as a member of the Southeastern Conference (SEC). The team was led by head coach Bear Bryant, in his sixth year, and played their home games at Denny Stadium in Tuscaloosa, Legion Field in Birmingham and Ladd Stadium in Mobile, Alabama. They finished season with nine wins and two losses (9–2 overall, 6–2 in the SEC) and with a victory over Ole Miss in the Sugar Bowl.

The Crimson Tide opened the season with wins at Georgia, against Tulane in Mobile and at Vanderbilt en route to a 3–0 start. However, in their fourth game, Alabama was upset by Florida in what was coach Bryant's first loss at Denny Stadium as head coach. They rebounded the week that followed with a shutout victory over Tennessee and then won their next three games against Houston, Mississippi State and Georgia Tech.

In the annual Iron Bowl against Auburn, the Crimson Tide were defeated for the first time by the Tigers since the 1958 season. Although they lost, immediately after the game Alabama accepted an invitation to play Ole Miss in the Sugar Bowl. Before the bowl, the Crimson Tide defeated Miami in their final game of the regular season. They then closed the season with a victory over Ole Miss in the Sugar Bowl.

Schedule

Game summaries

Georgia

Sources:

To open the 1963 season, the Crimson Tide defeated the Georgia Bulldogs 32–7 on the road at Athens. The lone Georgia touchdown was set up in the first quarter when Ken Davis recovered a Joe Namath fumble at the Alabama 26-yard line. Seven plays later, Georgia led 7–0 after Fred Barber scored on a three-yard run. The Crimson Tide tied the game later in the quarter on a 47-yard Namath touchdown pass to Charles Stephens and then took a 10–7 halftime lead when Tim Davis connected on a 38-yard field goal in the second quarter. Mike Fracchia then scored the next pair of Alabama touchdowns on runs of five and one-yard before Preston Ridlehuber was tackled for a safety in the fourth quarter. A 41-yard Jack Hurlbut touchdown pass to Jimmy Dill late in the fourth made the final score 32–7. The victory improved Alabama's all-time record against Georgia to 27–18–4.

Tulane

Sources:

After their victory over Georgia to open the season, Alabama up one spot in the AP Poll to the No. 2 position. At Mobile, the Crimson Tide shutout the Tulane Green Wave 28–0 in their annual Ladd Stadium game of the season. Alabama took a 7–0 lead in the first quarter after Joe Namath scored on a one-yard touchdown run. The extended their lead to 21–0 at halftime after Benny Nelson scored on a 33-yard run and by Billy Piper on a 51-yard interception return. A 20-yard Hudson Harris touchdown run in the third quarter provided for the final margin in this 28–0 Crimson Tide win. The victory improved Alabama's all-time record against Tulane to 21–10–3.

Vanderbilt

Sources:

After their victory over Tulane, Alabama retained its No. 2 position in the AP Poll prior to their game against Vanderbilt. At Nashville, the Crimson Tide defeated the Commodores 21–6 in a game that saw Benny Nelson score twice on long touchdown runs for Alabama. Midway through the first quarter, Nelson gave the Crimson Tide a 7–0 lead with his 50-yard touchdown run. Vanderbilt responded in the second quarter with a 25-yard Jon Cleveland touchdown pass to Toby Wilt; however the extra point was blocked and Alabama retained a 7–6 lead. Mike Fracchia then scored on a one-yard touchdown run that made the halftime score 14–6. Nelson then scored the final points of the game with his 97-yard kickoff return in the third quarter that made the final score 21–6. The victory improved Alabama's all-time record against Vanderbilt to 22–16–4.

Florida

Sources:

After their closer than expected victory over Vanderbilt, Alabama dropped from the No. 2 to the No. 3 position in the AP Poll prior to their game against Florida. In what was the first Tuscaloosa game of the season, the 17-point favorite Crimson Tide were upset by the Gators 10–6 in what was also coach Bryant's first loss as head coach at Denny Stadium. Bob Lyle gave the Gators an early 3–0 lead with his 42-yard field goal in the first quarter. The Alabama defense then produced a pair of goal line stands in the first half that resulted in a 3–0 Florida lead at halftime. After a scoreless third, Florida took a 10–0 lead in the fourth when Dick Kirk scored on a 42-yard touchdown run. With just over 2:00 left in the game, Joe Namath scored on a one-yard run to end the shutout bid, but Alabama still lost 10–6. The loss brought Alabama's all-time record against Florida to 8–5.

Tennessee

Sources:

Alabama dropped from the No. 3 position back into the No. 9 spot in the week leading into their game at Tennessee after their upset loss against Florida. Against the Volunteers, Alabama shutout Tennessee 35–0 in the first Legion Field game of the season. The Crimson Tide took a 7–0 lead in the first quarter after Benny Nelson scored on a 36-yard touchdown run. Joe Namath then was responsible for the remaining four touchdowns scored on the afternoon. He first threw a 26-yard scoring pass to Jimmy Dill late in the first and then threw a three-yard pass to Charles Stephens in the second that gave Alabama a 21–0 halftime lead. In the third, Namath threw his third touchdown pass to Hudson Harris from five-yards out then scored himself on a one-yard run that made the final score 35–0. The victory improved Alabama's all-time record against Tennessee to 21–19–6.

Houston

Sources:

As a result of their shutout win over Tennessee, the Crimson Tide moved into the No. 6 position in the AP poll prior to their game against Houston. Against a winless Cougars squad, Alabama struggled to a 21–13 victory at Denny Stadium. After a seven-yard Joe Namath touchdown pass to Benny Nelson gave the Crimson Tide a 7–0 lead in the first, a 41-yard Jack Skrog touchdown pass to Mike Spratt in the second for Houston tied the game 7–7 at halftime. The Crimson Tide retook the lead in the third on a 35-yard Nelson touchdown run and extended it to 21–7 on a 12-yard Namath touchdown pass to Ray Ogden early in the fourth. The Cougars then cut the lead to 21–13 after Spratt scored on a 75-yard touchdown run, but were unable to complete the comeback in the loss. The victory improved Alabama's all-time record against Houston to 5–0.

Mississippi State

Sources:

Although they did defeat Houston in their previous contest, Alabama dropped into the No. 7 ranking as they prepared to play Mississippi State. On homecoming in Tuscaloosa, the Crimson Tide scored a game-winning touchdown in the final four minutes of the game and defeated the Bulldogs 20–19. After Alabama took an early 3–0 lead on a 43-yard Tim Davis field goal in the first, State responded and took a 12–3 lead in the second quarter. The Bulldogs scored touchdowns on a one-yard Dan Bland run and on a 45-yard Larry Swearengen interception return of a Joe Namath pass. Alabama responded later in the quarter with a 40-yard Namath touchdown pass to Jimmy Dill and a 31-yard Davis field goal and took a 13–12 halftime lead. After a four-yard Swearengen run gave the Bulldogs a 19–13 lead in the third quarter, Namath scored the game-tying touchdown in the fourth quarter with just over four minutes left in the game. The Davis extra point that ensued provided for the final margin in Alabama's 20–19 win. The victory improved Alabama's all-time record against Mississippi State to 35–10–3.

Georgia Tech

Sources:

Coming off their bye week prior to their game against Georgia Tech, the Crimson Tide retained the No. 7 position in the AP poll. Behind strong performances on both sides of the ball, Alabama defeated the Yellow Jackets 27–11 at Legion Field. The Crimson Tide scored first on a 44-yard Ray Ogden touchdown run for a 7–0 first quarter lead. In the second, Tech scored on a 41-yard Billy Lothridge field goal and Alabama scored on a one-yard Benny Nelson touchdown run that made the halftime score 14–3. The Jackets responded with a two-yard Lothridge touchdown run in the third that cut the Crimson Tide lead to 14–11. Alabama then closed the game with fourth-quarter touchdowns scored on runs of six-yards by Nelson and one-yard by Joe Namath. The victory improved Alabama's all-time record against Georgia Tech to 23–19–3.

Auburn

Sources:

In the week prior to their game against Auburn, Alabama moved into the No. 6 position in the AP poll and the Tigers were in the No. 9 position. In the annual Iron Bowl game, Alabama was defeated by the Tigers for the first time since the 1958 season in this 10–8 loss at Legion Field. Auburn scored first on a 32-yard Woody Woodall field goal in the first quarter and maintained their 3–0 lead through halftime. The Tigers then extended their lead to 10–0 in the third quarter when Mailon Kent threw an eight-yard touchdown pass to Tucker Frederickson. Benny Nelson then scored the only Alabama touchdown later in the quarter on an 80-yard run that made the final score 10–8. Although they lost, after the game the Crimson Tide officially accepted an invitation to play in the Sugar Bowl against Ole Miss. The loss brought Alabama's all-time record against Auburn to 13–14–1.

Miami

Sources:

This game against the Miami was originally scheduled to be played on Friday, October 18, but was subsequently moved to December 7 in order to be televised on CBS. Due to the assassination of John F. Kennedy, the annual Army–Navy Game was pushed back to December 7. As such, CBS requested the Miami-Alabama game be postponed to December 14 in order to avoid conflict that would result from televising both games on the same day. The rescheduling of this game also pushed back the start of the annual Orange Blossom Classic from the afternoon to evening of December 14.

After their loss against Auburn, Alabama dropped into the No. 8 position in the final AP poll of the 1963 season. In the week that led to their game at Miami, coach Bryant suspended starting quarterback Joe Namath for both this game and the Sugar Bowl as he violated team rules. On homecoming at the Orange Bowl, Alabama survived a late Miami rally and defeated the Hurricanes 17–12.

The Crimson Tide took a 14–0 first quarter lead after touchdowns were scored by Gary Martin on a 100-yard kickoff return and by Benny Nelson on a one-yard Benny Nelson run. A 35-yard Tim Davis field goal in the second quarter made the halftime score 17–0 in favor of the Crimson Tide. The score remained unchanged until Miami rallied with a pair of fourth-quarter touchdowns that made the final score 17–12. The first came on a nine-yard George Mira pass to Nick Spinelli and the second on a one-yard Pete Banaszak run. The victory improved Alabama's all-time record against Miami to 5–2.

Ole Miss

Sources:

After their loss in the Iron Bowl on November 30, Alabama officially accepted an invitation to play the SEC champion Ole Miss Rebels for the first time since the 1944 season in a Sugar Bowl that featured a pair of SEC teams. As each team entered the game, Mississippi finished in the No. 7 position and Alabama in the No. 8 position in the final AP poll of the season. With starting quarterback Joe Namath still suspended, the Crimson Tide offense struggled, but four Tim Davis field goals proved to be enough for Alabama to win 12–7 over the Rebels.

Davis gave the Crimson Tide a 12–0 lead as then entered the fourth quarter after connecting from 31-yards in the first, 46 and 22-yards in the second and 48-yards in the third quarter. Ole Miss responded in the fourth quarter with their only points on a five-yard Perry Lee Dunn touchdown pass to Larry Smith that made the final score 12–7. For his four field goal performance, Davis was named the Sugar Bowl MVP. The victory improved Alabama's all-time record against Ole Miss 17–3–2.

NFL/AFL Draft
Several players that were varsity lettermen from the 1962 squad were drafted into the National Football League (NFL) and the American Football League (AFL) between the 1963 and 1965 drafts. These players included the following:

Freshman squad
Prior to the 1972 NCAA University Division football season, NCAA rules prohibited freshmen from participating on the varsity team, and as such many schools fielded freshmen teams. For the 1963 season, the Alabama freshmen squad was coached by Sam Bailey and finished their season with a record of three wins and one loss (3–1). After a 10–6 loss to Mississippi State to open the season, Alabama rebounded with a 3–0 victory over Tulane at Denny Stadium. Dudley Kerr scored the Tide's only points with his 29-yard field goal in the second quarter.

In their third game, the Baby Tide defeated Auburn 21–14 at Cliff Hare Stadium. Alabama took an early 6–0 lead when Wayne Trimble threw a 10-yard touchdown pass to Kent Busbee in the first quarter. They extended it to 21–0 with second-quarter touchdowns scored by John Mosely on a pair of one-yard runs. Auburn responded with a 21-yard Tom Bryan touchdown run that made the halftime score 21–7. After a scoreless third, the Tigers made the final score 21–14 after Bryan threw a 21-yard touchdown pass to Scotty Long.

Alabama then closed the season with a 17–16 victory over a previously undefeated Ole Miss freshmen team in Tuscaloosa. The Rebels' scored on their opening possession on an 18-yard Joe Graves touchdown pass to James McCraney for a 7–0 lead. After a 41-yard Jimmy Keys field goal late in the second extended the Ole Miss lead to 10–0, Graves threw a 13-yard touchdown pass to McCraney with only 0:04 remaining in the first half for a 16–0 halftime lead. Alabama rallied in the third quarter with a pair of touchdowns that cut the Rebels' lead to 16–14. The first came when Louis Thompson recovered a Graves fumble in the endzone and the second on a 48-yard Wayne Trimble pass to Kent Busbee. A game-winning, 36-yard Dudley Kerr field goal late in the fourth quarter made the final score 17–16.

Personnel

Varsity letter winners

Coaching staff

References
General

 
 

Specific

Alabama
Alabama Crimson Tide football seasons
Sugar Bowl champion seasons
Alabama Crimson Tide football